Animated Antics is an animated cartoon series produced by the Fleischer Studios from 1940 through 1941, and distributed through Paramount Pictures.

Each cartoon ran less than 7 minutes, all in black & white (reports that Copy Cat was in Technicolor are erroneous, confirmed by the B&W Original Camera Negative on deposit at the UCLA Film & Television Archive). Five cartoons in the series were spinoffs from Fleischer Studios' 1939 feature film Gulliver's Travels, starring the villains Sneak, Snoop, and Snitch and the carrier pigeon Twinkletoes from the movie, all voiced by Jack Mercer. The studio produced 11 cartoons in this series.

Filmography

Other films released by Paramount as Animated Antics include these two non-Fleischer short films:

References 

 Cabarga, Leslie. The Fleischer Story (Da Capo Press; 1988), p. 174. 

Fleischer Studios short films
Film series introduced in 1940
Animated film series